Stream Passage Pot is one of the entrances to the Gaping Gill system being located about  ESE of Gaping Gill Main Shaft. It is a popular and sporting entrance into the system, featuring three well-watered big shafts. It is the highest entrance of the Gaping Gill system, so the full depth of the system, is measured from its entrance. It lies within the designated Ingleborough Site of Special Scientific Interest.

Description

Stream Passage Pot is at the end of a blind valley. An awkward passage soon terminates in a small pitch  into a chamber where the stream enters. The descent route involves traversing and technical rope rigging to avoid the waterfalls. The last pitch drops into Stream Passage in Gaping Gill.

The water flows through Stream Passage into Stream Chamber. The water is next seen in the deep pool at the bottom of South-East Pot below the final pitch of Flood Entrance Pot.

History

The cave was dug into on 10 March 1949, and explored by the Northern Pennine Club during the following Easter weekend. The entrance became blocked in the early 1980s, and in 1984 it was re-opened by the Bradford Pothole Club who installed the current galvanised tubing through the unstable boulder ruckle in the shakehole.

In November 1979 the cave became the centre of a major rescue when Jeremy Peterson went missing on a solo pull-through trip. He was found alive and well after 57 hours, having gone off route and fallen down the Mud Pot pitch. He had fractured a wrist and was badly bruised, and the only food he had during his ordeal was a Mars Bar. In 1989 Andrea Wynne was rescued after she fell  when she came to the end of the rope when abseiling down a  pitch, sustaining head injuries, a fractured arm, cuts and bruises. She subsequently provided an account of her experience.

References

External links
An interview with Jes Peterson concerning his rescue
Andrea Wynne's audio account of her rescue read by Jack Pickup

Caves of North Yorkshire
Wild caves
Limestone caves